Akbari Sufism or Akbarism (Arabic: أكبرية: Akbariyya) is a branch of Sufi metaphysics based on the teachings of Ibn Arabi, an Andalusian Sufi who was a gnostic and philosopher. The word is derived from Ibn Arabi's nickname, "Shaykh al-Akbar," meaning "the greatest master." 'Akbariyya' or 'Akbaris' have never been used to indicate a specific Sufi group or society. It is now used to refer to all historical or contemporary Sufi metaphysicians and Sufis influenced by Ibn Arabi's doctrine of Wahdat al-Wujud. It is not to be confused with Al Akbariyya, a secret Sufi society founded by Swedish Sufi 'Abdu l-Hadi Aguéli.

Wahdat al-Wujud 
Wahdat al-Wajud (Arabic: وحدة الوجود Persian: وحدت وجود) meaning the "unity of being" is a Sufi philosophy emphasizing that "there is no true existence except the Ultimate Truth (God)", that is, that the only truth within the universe is God, and that all things exist within God only.

Ibn Arabi is most often characterized in Islamic texts as the originator of this doctrine. However, it is not found in his works. The first to employ this term was Ibn Sabin.

Ibn Arabi's disciple and stepson Sadr al-Din al-Qunawi used this term in his own works and explained it using philosophical terms.

Academic study

Europe and United States 

In the 20th century there has been a focus on the Akbari School in academic circles and universities. Viewed in a historical context, increased government support for the study of the Muslim world and Islamic languages emerged in the United States after the Second World War where many students were attracted to Islam and religious studies during the 1970s.

The greatest growth in American scholarship on Sufism took place during the 1970s. Alexander Knysh notes that, "In the decades after World War Two the majority of Western experts in Sufism were no longer based in Europe, but in North America." Henri Corbin (d. 1978) and Fritz Meier (d. 1998), who were prominent among these experts, made important contributions to the study of Islamic mysticism. Other important names were Miguel Asín Palacios (d. 1944) and Louis Massignon (d. 1962), who made contributions to Ibn Arabi studies. Palacios discovered some Akbarian elements in Dante's Divine Comedy. Massignon studied the famous Sufi Al-Hallaj saying "Ana l-Haq" (I am the Truth).

Seyyed Hossein Nasr and his students and academic disciples have come to play an important role in certain subfields of Sufi studies. The influence of Nasr and other Traditionalist writers like Rene Guenon and Frithjof Schuon on Sufi studies can be seen in the interpretation of the works of Ibn Arabi and the Akbari school by such scholars as Titus Burckhardt, Martin Lings, James Morris, William Chittick, Sachiko Murata, and others. These names are both mostly practitioners of Sufism and scholars studying Sufism.

Turkey 

Turkey is situated where Ibn Arabi's most prominent disciple, successor and stepson Sadr al-Din al-Qunawi, and other important commentators on Arabi's works lived in the past. Dawūd al-Qayṣarī, who was invited to Iznik by Orhan Ghazi to be the director and teacher for the first Ottoman university (madrasa), was the disciple of Kamāl al-Dīn al-Qāshānī, himself a disciple of Sadr al-Dīn al-Qūnawī. This means that the official teaching itself was set in motion by a great master of the Akbari school. Not only Sufis but also Ottoman sultans, politicians and intellectuals had been deeply impressed by Ibn Arabi and his disciples and interpreters. Seyyed Muhammad Nur al-Arabi was also impressed by Ibn Arabi's doctrine, though that continued to decrease until the Modern Era. In the 20th century the last important commentator of Fusûs was Ahmed Avni Konuk (d. 1938). He was a mawlawî and composer of Turkish music.

Studies on Sufism, especially Akbari works, were not very common until the first Ph.D. thesis was written by Mahmud Erol Kılıc in Marmara University's Faculty of Theology titled "Ibn 'Arabi's Ontology" (in Turkish, "Muhyiddin İbn Arabi'de Varlık ve Varlık Mertebeleri") in 1995. Academic studies on Akbari metaphysics and philosophy began to rise after studies on this topic were conducted by Turkish scholars such as Mustafa Tahralı and Mahmud Erol Kılıc.

In terms of Akbari studies, the most important event to take place was the translation of Ibn Arabi's magnum opus,"Futuhat-ı Makkiyya", to Turkish. Turkish scholar Ekrem Demirli translated the work in 18 volumes between 2006 and 2012. This particular translation was the first complete translation to another language. Demirli's work also includes translating Sadr al-Din al-Qunawi's corpus to Turkish and writing a PhD thesis on him in 2004, writing a commentary on Fusus al-Hikam by Ibn Arabi, and writing a book titled İslam Metafiziğinde Tanrı ve İnsan (God and Human in Islamic Metaphysics), [Istanbul: Kabalcı, 2009].

There are many Akbari works in Ottoman Turkish that are yet to be studied by scholars.

List of some Akbaris

There have been many Akbari Sufis, metaphysicians and philosophers. While Ibn Arabi never founded a Tarikah himself, he created a majority of the philosophy around it with his Wahdat al-Wujud. The Sufis listed below were members of different orders, but following the concept of Wahdat al-Wujud.

 Sadr al-Din al-Qunawi (d. 1274) - student and stepson of Ibn ‘Arabī. Lived in Konya the same time as Mawlānā Jalāl-ad-Dīn Rumi
 Fakhr al-Din Iraqi (1213–1289)
 Sa'id al-Din Farghani (d. 1300)
 Mahmud Shabistari (1288–1340)
 Dawūd al-Qayṣarī (d. 1351)
 Ḥaydar Āmūlī (d. 1385)
 Abd-al-karim Jili (d. 1428)
 Mulla Shams ad-Din al-Fanari (1350–1431)
 Shah Ni'matullah Wali (1330–1431)
 Abdurrahman Jami (1414–1492)
 Idris Bitlisi (d. 1520)
 ʿAbd al-Wahhāb ibn Aḥmad al-Shaʿrānī(1493–1565)
 Mulla Sadra (1571–1641)
 Abd al-Ghani al-Nabulsi (1641–1731)
 Ismail Hakki Bursevi (1652–1725)
 Ahmad ibn Ajiba (1747–1809)
 Abd al-Qadir al-Jaza'iri (1808–1883)
 Ahmad al-Alawi (1869–1934)
 Abd al-Wahid Yahya (René Guénon) (1886–1951)
 Mustafa 'Abd al-'Aziz (1911–1974)
 Abdel-Halim Mahmoud (1910–1978)
 Javad Nurbakhsh (1926–2008)

References

Further reading 
 Masataka Takeshita: Ibn 'Arabi's Theory of the Perfect Man and Its Place in the History of Islamic Thought, Tokyo: Institute for the Study of Languages and Cultures of Asia and Africa, Tokyo University of Foreign Studies, 1987
 William C. Chittick: Ibn 'Arabi's Imaginal Worlds: Creativity of Imagination and the Problem of Religious Diversity
 _: The Sufi Path of Knowledge: Ibn al-'Arabi's Metaphysics of Imagination
 __: Ibn 'Arabi - Heir to the Prophets.
 __: Imaginal Worlds.
 __: The Self-Disclosure of God
 Stephen Hirtenstein: The Unlimited Mercifier: The Spiritual Life and Thought of Ibn 'Arabi
 _: Prayer and Contemplation: The Principles of Spiritual Life according to Ibn 'Arabi.
 Henry Corbin: Creative Imagination of the Sufism of Ibn 'Arabi
 __: Alone with the Alone: Creative Imagination in the Sufism of Ibn 'Arabi.
 Claude Addas: Looking for the Red Sulphur: The Story of the Life of Ibn 'Arabi
 ___: The Voyage of No Return
 Michel Chodkiewicz: An Ocean without Shore -Ibn 'Arabi, The Book and the Law.
 ___: The Seal of the Saints
 ___: The Spiritual Writings of Amir Abd al-Kader
 Peter Coates : Ibn 'Arabi and Modern Thought - The History of Taking Metaphysics Seriously
 Alexander D. Knysh: Ibn 'Arabi in the later Islamic Tradition
 Titus Burckhardt: Mystical Astrology According to Ibn 'Arabi
 __: Universal Man by Abd al-Karim al-Jili translated with commentary
 Michael Sells: Mystical Languages of Unsaying
 Ronald L. Nettler: Sufi Metaphysics and Qur'anic Prophets: Ibn 'Arabi's thought and method in the Fusûs al-Hikam
 Toshihiko Izutsu: Sufism and Taoism, Comparative work between Lao Tzu and Ibn Arabi's doctrines.
 Caner K. Dagli: The Ringstones of Wisdom (Fusús al-hikam) translation, introduction & glosses by Caner K. Dagli.
 E.A. Afifi : Ibn Arabi: Life and Works, 
 Mohamed Haj Yousef: Ibn 'Arabi – Time and Cosmology
 Pablo Beneito: La taberna de las luces, Ibn Arabi, Shusteri and other Sufis' poems translated to Spanish. Editora Regional de Murcia, 2004
 Fernando Mora: Ibn 'Arabi - Vida y enseñanzas del gran místico andalusí. Editorial Kairós, 2011

External links

Articles 
 The Academic Study of Sufism at American Universities
 Sufism and Akbarian Tradition
 Practical Sufism: An Akbarian Foundation for a Liberal Theology of Difference by Vincent Cornell
 Early Bestsellers in Akbarian Tradition
 A French Sufi-Akbarian Order 
 A General Outline of the Influence of Ibn 'Arabi on the Ottoman Era
 The Self and Other 
 The Reflection of the Wahdat al Wujud
 Akbarian Turn

Videos 
 James Morris - Whosoever knows himself (Youtube video)
 William Chittick (Symposium-Youtube video)

Sufism
Akbarian Sufis